Monique Adamczak and Olivia Rogowska were the defending champions, however both players chose not to participate.

The top seeds Han Xinyun and Junri Namigata won the title, defeating Wang Yafan and Yang Zhaoxuan in the final, 6–4, 3–6, [10–6].

Seeds

Draw

References 
 Draw

Launceston Tennis International
Launceston Tennis International - Doubles
2015 in Australian tennis